Frank D'Angelo (born April 23, 1959) is a Canadian entrepreneur in the food, restaurant and entertainment industries. D'Angelo has made several feature-length films through his In Your Ear Productions. He is also the founder of D'Angelo Brands and the now-defunct Steelback Brewery and is host of The Being Frank Show, a weekly late night talk show.

Early life
D'Angelo was born in Toronto to Italian immigrants Giuseppe and Carmela D'Angelo. His father owned Napoli Foods. the younger D'Angelo showed an interest in business at an early age: at age 9 he outsourced his newspaper delivery of the Toronto Telegram to other children. He had many sales positions sometimes concurrently. He purchased his first home successfully at age 20. D'Angelo started in the food industry working for his father until Napoli Foods was sold to Saputo.

Business career
D'Angelo is founder and president of D'Angelo Brands, Inc., which produces and markets beverages and some canned food items in Canada.  It started in 1986 by selling apple juice door-to-door, and the company quickly grew to success with the financial backing of Canadian politician Al Palladini. His company filed for credit protection in late 2007. On February 16, 2008, a numbered company owned by D'Angelo's family bought back D'Angelo Brands. Cheetah Power Surge is an energy drink produced by D'Angelo Brands.

In September 2002, he started and was the CEO of Steelback Brewery.  Steelback commercials from 2002 to 2007 always starred Frank D'Angelo and presented him as a known celebrity (although he was relatively unknown) and the face of Steelback.  He has said that "I am the Brand". Steelback invested around $15M per year on advertising. The ads were often shown in high-cost slots during Hockey Night In Canada broadcasts. Hockey related spots starred him and hockey celebrities such as Shayne Corson, Darcy Tucker and Phil Esposito. In one commercial, he interviewed Ben Johnson in a pretend talk show titled 'Being Frank'. He was replaced after the company's financial problems in late 2007. By 2010, the Steelback Brewery was closed.

On December 18, 2006, D'Angelo declared an interest in buying the Pittsburgh Penguins hockey team. In 2007, D'Angelo expressed interest in reviving the Canadian Football League's Ottawa Renegades (with the intention of naming them the Ottawa Steelbacks), but the league rejected him as an owner, with media speculating it was because he was a "shameless publicity hound".

D'Angelo owned the Forget About It Supper Club restaurant on King Street in Toronto.

In March 2012, D'Angelo launched a sports-themed media website called Next Sport Star where he hosts a weekly show with Hockey Hall of Fame inductee Phil Esposito and former Toronto Maple Leafs assistant general manager Bill Watters. The site was backed by the late Canadian pharmaceutical billionaire Bernard Sherman, who also backed D'Angelo in his Steelback Brewery enterprise.

Entertainment

Music
D'Angelo is the singer for his band named after his brewery called the Steelback 2–4, which includes Mike Reno from Loverboy. Their first album, You Gotta Believe to Believe, raised funds for victims of Hurricane Katrina, the Breast Cancer Society and the Hospital for Sick Children.  On May 21, 2009, they announced the release of their second album Full Circle with nine original songs and four cover tunes. Frank D'Angelo has recorded a total of 18 CDs, with over 100 original songs he's written and sings. They're all available on Spotify, Apple, Amazon and digital platforms World wide,. Distributed by Sony Orchard. You can purchase hardcopy CDs on his site www.frankdangelo.ca.  All his music and trailers for his movies, are on his popular YouTube channel frankdangelomusic.

He has performed the opening anthem and other songs at Toronto Argonauts games, which were sponsored by his company Steelback Brewery. 

He was booed after performing before the July 26, 2007 CFL game, a loss against the Montreal Alouettes. D'Angelo later issued an apology.

He released a recording of "Silent Night" in November 2009, with an RnB vocal style. Profits from sales went to support Toronto charities which help the homeless. D'Angelo has also been an active volunteer to help the city's homeless.

Television
In November 2010, D'Angelo purchased airtime on a number of Canadian television stations to launch his The Being Frank Show.  It is broadcast Fridays at 11.30pm. The first show was on November 5, 2010 on CHCH in Hamilton, Ontario. The show is interspersed with 'Commercial Timeouts' promoting his related products, as well as other products.

D'Angelo also hosts an internet live broadcast show on nextsportstar.com ("NSS Live"), broadcast Tuesdays and Thursdays from 3pm to 5pm, with Phil Esposito, Bill Watters and various guests.

Radio
D'Angelo hosts a one hour radio show on the Jewel Radio network across Canada, on Sunday from 6pm to 7pm. It's on temporary hiatus.

Movies
He has written, produced, directed, scored and starred in nine feature-length films through his company, In Your Ear Productions. Distribution is through iTunes, Amazon and various vod worldwide. Canadian & American cable companies. His first film Real Gangsters was released in 2013. Followed by "The Big Fat Stone" and "No Deposit". In 2015, he released the horror drama film Sicilian Vampire. This was followed by The Red Maple Leaf in 2016. D'Angelo completed his sixth feature film The Neighborhood, which premiered June 15, 2017, in Toronto at the Italian Contemporary Film Festival. His seventh film, The Joke Thief co-starring Steven Kerzner (Ed the Sock), Frank's former sidekick on Being Frank, was released in 2018, followed by The Last Big Save, and Making a Deal with the Devil.

In 2019 he appeared in a supporting acting role in Kire Paputts' film The Last Porno Show. D'Angelo is working on a new project, delayed by Covid-19.

Style and approach
D'Angelo is a self-trained film maker. He shoots on a very tight shooting schedule, often using multiple cameras and angles, allowing him to shoot close-ups and wide shots in the same take. He employs a recurring cast of actors including Tony Nardi, Daniel Baldwin, Jason Blicker, John Ashton, Alyson Court, and Art Hindle. He also tends to uses big name guest stars. Past films have included Margot Kidder, James Caan, Paul Sorvino and Martin Landau.

Controversy

Sexual assault allegations
On June 9, 2007, D'Angelo was arrested in the alleged sexual assault of a 21-year-old woman. He was acquitted on April 21, 2009. Justice John Hamilton said he found the evidence of both D'Angelo and his accuser credible. But in handing down his ruling, Hamilton added D'Angelo "may be" or is "probably" guilty of the crime.

Obstruction of Justice allegations
Several days after being acquitted, D'Angelo hosted a party at his Forget About It Supper Club. An Ontario Provincial Police surveillance team took photographs showing veteran Ontario Provincial Police sergeant Michael Rutigliano, and two crown attorneys, Richard Bennett and Domenic Basile, present at the same celebration. On May 14, Rutigliano was charged with attempting to influence the outcome of the case. He was accused of conspiring with D'Angelo to obstruct the prosecution of the case. D'Angelo was charged the next day with conspiring to obstruct justice and obstructing justice. He was to appear in court on June 8, 2009, in Brampton, and his case was adjourned until May 31, 2010. On September 2, 2010, the obstruction charges against D'Angelo were stayed permanently.

Libel suit
In June 2007, D'Angelo launched a $2 million libel suit against blogger Neate Sager for an unrelated posting on Sager's blog site.  D'Angelo dropped the suit when Sager posted an apology.

References

External links

1959 births
Businesspeople from Toronto
Canadian brewers
Canadian male film actors
Canadian people of Italian descent
Canadian television talk show hosts
Living people
Male actors from Toronto
Writers from Toronto
21st-century Canadian male actors
21st-century Canadian screenwriters